Moscow State Technical University of Civil Aviation (MSTUCA) is a leading institution of higher education in Russia which trains civil aviation specialists and acts as a center of science and culture training of specialists and fundamental scientific research in the field of science, technology, humanities, and economics. It is located in Moscow and was founded in 1971.

General Information
The university has links with foreign educational institutions and trains foreign students from over 30 countries.

The university departments are headed by experienced scientists and academics. There are professors and academics of different public and scientific academies in Russia and abroad. The training and research laboratories are equipped with modern computers, instruments and devices, stands, simulators, working models of aviation equipment, technical training and knowledge test aids. This makes it possible to conduct classes and carry out scientific work at a modern level of science and technology.

The university library contains textbooks on specialties of all the departments; there are publications on crucial problems of science, technology and social sciences. It is one of the best aviation-oriented libraries in Russia.

The MSTUCA has a dormitory located in a park, not far from the university and the underground station. The students live in rooms for 2 or 3 persons.

The university's facilities provide good conditions for amateur activities, student's festivals, concerts of masters of art and popular musical groups. It also has a sports complex and many athletes clubs.

Foreign students are trained together with Russian students. Training is conducted in Russian.

Academic ethics violations 
The rector of MSTU CA was accused of academic dishonesty  and stripped of Doctor Nauk degree on 25 January 2019. Nevertheless, he continues to head the institution.

See also
SDB Karat, an ultralight trike aircraft design developed at the university

References

Universities in Moscow
Universities and institutes established in the Soviet Union